Thorner and Wothersome are civil parishes in the metropolitan borough of the City of Leeds, West Yorkshire, England.  The parishes contain 34 listed buildings that are recorded in the National Heritage List for England.  All the listed buildings are designated at Grade II, the lowest of the three grades, which is applied to "buildings of national importance and special interest".  The parishes contain the village of Thorner, the area of Wothersome, and the surrounding countryside.  Most of the listed buildings are houses and associated structures, the majority along Main Street of Thorner.  The others include a cross base and shaft, a church and a grave slab in the churchyard, a former church and attached Sunday school, a farmhouse, farm buildings, a road bridge, and a milestone.


Buildings

References

Citations

Sources

Lists of listed buildings in West Yorkshire